Genesis is a 2004 documentary film written and directed by Claude Nuridsany and Marie Pérennou that explores the origins of earth and its inhabitants. The film focuses on the life of many animals. It is narrated by Sotigui Kouyaté.

The film credits also list the natural events, animals and their situations as part of the "cast list."

References

External links 
 
 
 

Italian documentary films
French documentary films
Documentary films about nature
2004 films
2004 documentary films
Films scored by Bruno Coulais
2000s French films